Geoffrey Grant Abbott (born 17 April 1985) is a South African field hockey player who competed in the 2008 Summer Olympics.

References

External links

1985 births
Living people
South African male field hockey players
Olympic field hockey players of South Africa
Field hockey players at the 2008 Summer Olympics
21st-century South African people